Kyaka (Enga-Kyaka) is an Engan language of the East New Guinea Highlands in Enga Province, Papua New Guinea.

References

Engan languages
Languages of Enga Province
Languages of Papua New Guinea